Nocturnes of Hellfire & Damnation is the thirteenth album by New York heavy/power metal group Virgin Steele, released via SPV/Steamhammer on June 19, 2015.

The album is issued in CD format, Limited Edition Digi-pack (with a bonus CD) and a double LP Vinyl set.

Reception

Track listing
All music and lyrics by David DeFeis

	Limited edition Digipak, CD 2

Personnel
Virgin Steele
David DeFeis - vocals, keyboards, orchestration, producer, engineer
Edward Pursino - guitars
Josh Block - guitars, bass, engineer
Frank Gilchriest - drums

Production
Ed Warrin - engineer

References

2015 albums
Virgin Steele albums
Concept albums
SPV/Steamhammer albums